The Autana River (Río Autana) is a blackwater river of Venezuela, a tributary of the Sipapo River in the middle Orinoco River basin.

Course
Its headwaters lie in the western portion of the Guiana Shield, north of the Ventuari River. It flows in a generally westerly direction and drains into the right margin of the Sipapo River near Lake Guiripipi (Laguna Guiripipi).

See also
List of rivers of Venezuela
Autana Municipality

Notes and references

Rivers of Venezuela